The 30th parallel north is a circle of latitude that is 30 degrees north of the Earth's equatorial plane.  It stands one-third of the way between the equator and the North Pole and crosses Africa, Asia, the Pacific Ocean, North America and the Atlantic Ocean. The parallel is used in some contexts to delineate Europe or what is associated with the continent of Europe as a southernmost limit, e.g. to qualify for membership of the European Broadcasting Union. 

It is the approximate southern border of the horse latitudes in the Northern Hemisphere, meaning that much of the land area touching the 30th parallel is arid or semi-arid. If there is a source of wind from a body of water the area would more likely be humid subtropical.

At this latitude the sun is visible for 14 hours, 5 minutes during the summer solstice and 10 hours, 13 minutes during the winter solstice, and the nighttime duration lasts 9 hours, 55 minutes during the summer solstice and 13 hours, 47 minutes during the winter solstice. On 21 June, the maximum altitude of the sun is 83.44 degrees and 36.56 degrees on 21 December.

At this latitude:
 One degree of longitude =  96.49 km or  59.95 mi
 One minute of longitude =   1.61 km or   1.00 mi
 One second of longitude =  26.80 m  or  87.93 ft

Around the world
Starting at the Prime Meridian and heading eastwards, the parallel 30° north passes through:

{| class="wikitable plainrowheaders"
! scope="col"  width="125" | Co-ordinates
! scope="col" | Country, territory or sea
! scope="col" | Notes
|-
| 
! scope="row" | 
|
|-
| 
! scope="row" | 
|
|-
| 
! scope="row" | 
| Passing just south of Cairo
|-
| 
! scope="row" | 
| Passing just north of Kibbutz Lotan
|-
| 
! scope="row" | 
|
|-
| 
! scope="row" | 
| Passing through Sakakah
|-
| 
! scope="row" | 
|
|-
| 
! scope="row" | 
| Mainland and Warbah Island
|-
| style="background:#b0e0e6;" | 
! scope="row" style="background:#b0e0e6;" | Persian Gulf
| style="background:#b0e0e6;" |
|-
| 
! scope="row" | 
|
|-
| 
! scope="row" | 
|
|-
| style="background:#b0e0e6;" | 
! scope="row" style="background:#b0e0e6;" | Persian Gulf
| style="background:#b0e0e6;" |
|-
| 
! scope="row" | 
| For about 2 km
|-
| style="background:#b0e0e6;" | 
! scope="row" style="background:#b0e0e6;" | Persian Gulf
| style="background:#b0e0e6;" |
|-
| 
! scope="row" | 
|
|-
| 
! scope="row" | 
|
|-valign="top"
| 
! scope="row" | 
| Balochistan Punjab
|-valign="top"
| 
! scope="row" | 
| Rajasthan Punjab Haryana Uttar Pradesh Uttarakhand
|-
| 
! scope="row" | 
|
|-valign="top"
| 
! scope="row" | 
| Tibet Sichuan Chongqing Hubei Hunan Hubei Anhui Jiangxi Anhui Zhejiang — passing through Shaoxing
|-
| style="background:#b0e0e6;" | 
! scope="row" style="background:#b0e0e6;" | East China Sea
| style="background:#b0e0e6;" | Hangzhou Bay
|-
| 
! scope="row" | 
| Zhejiang (islands of Jintang, Zhoushan and Mount Putuo)
|-
| style="background:#b0e0e6;" | 
! scope="row" style="background:#b0e0e6;" | East China Sea
| style="background:#b0e0e6;" | Hangzhou Bay
|-
| 
! scope="row" |  
| Island of Kuchinoshima
|-
| style="background:#b0e0e6;" | 
! scope="row" style="background:#b0e0e6;" | Pacific Ocean
| style="background:#b0e0e6;" |
|-
| 
! scope="row" | 
| Baja California
|-
| style="background:#b0e0e6;" | 
! scope="row" style="background:#b0e0e6;" | Gulf of California
| style="background:#b0e0e6;" |
|-
| 
! scope="row" | 
| SonoraChihuahua
|-
|-valign="top"
| 
! scope="row" |  
| Texas — passes through Houston as well as through the George Bush Intercontinental Airport  Louisiana — passes through New Orleans
|-
| style="background:#b0e0e6;" | 
! scope="row" style="background:#b0e0e6;" | Gulf of Mexico
| style="background:#b0e0e6;" |
|-
| 
! scope="row" |  
| Louisiana - Chandeleur Islands
|-
| style="background:#b0e0e6;" | 
! scope="row" style="background:#b0e0e6;" | Gulf of Mexico
| style="background:#b0e0e6;" |
|-
| 
! scope="row" |  
| Florida
|-
| style="background:#b0e0e6;" | 
! scope="row" style="background:#b0e0e6;" | Gulf of Mexico
| style="background:#b0e0e6;" | Apalachee Bay
|-
| 
! scope="row" |  
| Florida — passes just north of St. Augustine
|-
| style="background:#b0e0e6;" | 
! scope="row" style="background:#b0e0e6;" | Atlantic Ocean
| style="background:#b0e0e6;" |
|-
| style="background:#b0e0e6;" | 
! scope="row" style="background:#b0e0e6;" | 
| style="background:#b0e0e6;" | Passes just south of the Savage Islands
|-
| 
! scope="row" | 
|
|-
| 
! scope="row" | 
|
|}

See also
29th parallel north
31st parallel north
30th parallel south
Subtropical ridge

References

n30